Events from the year 1832 in the United Kingdom.

Incumbents
 Monarch – William IV
 Prime Minister – Charles Grey, 2nd Earl Grey (Whig)
 Foreign Secretary – Henry John Temple, 3rd Viscount Palmerston 
 Parliament – 10th (until 3 December)

Events
 12 February – second cholera pandemic begins to spread in London, starting from East London. It is declared officially over in early May but deaths continue. It will claim at least 3000 victims. In Liverpool, Kitty Wilkinson becomes the "Saint of the Slums" by promoting hygiene.
 7 June – the Great Reform Act becomes law, extending suffrage to all upper-middle-class men, and abolishing the rotten boroughs. Similar legislation is passed for Scotland (the Scottish Reform Act) and Ireland (An Act to Amend the Representation of the People of Ireland, the Irish Reform Act).
 4 July – University of Durham founded by Act of Parliament
 16 July – "The Bad Day": 31 sixareens, the traditional fishing craft of Shetland, are lost in a storm with 105 crew.
 19 July – Anatomy Act provides for licensing and inspection of anatomists, and for unclaimed bodies from public institutions to be available for their dissection.
 1 August – Prescription Act reforms the law related to easements and establishes the right of ancient lights.
 7 August – William Howley, Archbishop of Canterbury, has his coach attacked by an angry mob on his first official visit to Canterbury because of his opposition to the Great Reform Act.
 11–14 August – the body of James Cook, a bookbinder executed the previous day for the murder of his creditor Paas, is hung in irons on a gibbet in Leicester, the last time this practice is carried out.
 1 September – reformer Joseph Livesey draws up the first public pledge of teetotalism in Preston, Lancashire.
 8 December – 8 January 1833 – general election, the first under the new system of voting, gives the Whigs a decisive majority.

Publications
 Dr James Kay's study The moral and physical condition of the working-class employed in the cotton manufacture on Manchester.
 Walter Scott's novels Count Robert of Paris and Castle Dangerous.

Births
 16 January – Sister Dora, born Dorothy Pattison, Anglican nun and nurse (died 1878)
 27 January – Lewis Carroll, born Charles Lutwidge Dodgson, children's author, mathematician, logician, Anglican deacon and portrait photographer (died 1898)
 12 March – Charles Boycott, land agent, origin of the word "boycott" (died 1897)
 14 May – Charles Peace, criminal (hanged 1879)
 17 June – Sir William Crookes, chemist and physicist (died 1919)
 30 September – Frederick Roberts, 1st Earl Roberts, field marshal (died 1914)
 2 October – Edward Burnett Tylor, anthropologist (died 1917)
 28 November – Leslie Stephen, writer and critic (died 1904)
 Full date unknown – Boston Corbett, Union Army soldier who shot and killed Abraham Lincoln's assassin, John Wilkes Booth (died 1894)

Deaths
 13 January – Thomas Lord, cricketer and founder of Lord's Cricket Ground (born 1755)
 27 January – Andrew Bell, educationist and priest (born 1753)
 10 March – Muzio Clementi, Roman pianist, composer and piano manufacturer (born 1752)
 6 June – Jeremy Bentham, philosopher (born 1748)
 23 June – Sir James Hall, 4th Baronet, geologist (born 1761)
 26 August – Robert Radcliffe, cricketer (born 1797)
 21 September – Sir Walter Scott, Scottish historical novelist and poet (born 1771)

See also
 1832 in Scotland

References

 
Years of the 19th century in the United Kingdom